José Ignacio Fresneda García (Villanueva de la Fuente, Ciudad Real, 19 June 1971), better known as Nacho Fresneda, is a Spanish actor known for his portrayal of the character of Manuel Aimé in the series Hospital Central and as Alonso de Entrerríos in the series, El Ministerio del Tiempo (The Ministry of Time). He has also worked in cinema and theatre, as well as in other television projects, mainly for  TV3 (Catalonia). He also played doctor Mauricio Salcedo in the series Amar en tiempo turños. He hit the international scene in 2011 when he played Driss Larbi in the Arturo Pérez-Reverte's American production, La Reina del Sur ("The Queen of the South").

Filmography

Feature films
Tramway to Malvarrosa (Tranvía a la Malvarrosa) (1997), by José Luis García Sánchez.
Tre mogli (2001), by Marco Risi .
La gran mentira del rocanrol (2002), by Tono Errando .
The Bum's Lullaby (La tarara del chapao) (2003), by Enrique Navarro .
Febrer (2004), by Sílvia Quer .
Iris (2004), by Rosa Vergés .
Atlas of Human Geography (2007), by Azucena Rodríguez .
The Realm (2018), by Rodrigo Sorogoyen .
The Silence of the Marsh (2019), by Marc Vigil

Short films

Sonata (2013), by Jon Ander Tomás .
I do not plan to return (2001), by Alicia Puig .
Los Planetas (2006), by José Carlos Ruiz .
Salvador (History of an everyday miracle) (2007), by Abdelatif Hwidar .

Dubbing

Rollerball (2002), as Sanjay (Naveen Andrews).
Tears of the Sun (2003), as Terwase (Peter Mensah).
Crash (2004), as Farhad (Shaun Toub).
The Hangover (2009), as Stu Price (Ed Helms).
The International (2009), as General Charles Motomba (Lucian Msamati).
Terminator Salvation (2009), as Marcus Wright (Sam Worthington).
Clash of the Titans (2010), as Perseus (Sam Worthington).
Buried (2010), as Jabir (José Luis García Pérez).
The Hangover Part II (2011), as Stu Price (Ed Helms).
Wrath of the Titans (2012), as Perseus (Sam Worthington).
The Hangover Part III (2013), as Stu Price (Ed Helms).
Alisa, que no fue así  (2015), as August

Television

Series
Ambitions (1998)
El cor de la Ciutat (2000–2008) as Huari AjiramHospital Central (2002–2008) as Manuel Aimé Torrente  Fresneda reappeared in the last episode of the 19th season.Amar en tiempos revueltos ("To Love in troubled times") (2009–2010)La Reina del Sur (2011) as Dris LarbiGran Nord (2012–2013) as Ermengol TarrésVíctor Ros (2015) as Fernando de la Escosura
El ministerio del tiempo (2015 -) as Alonso de Entrerríos
El Señor de los Cielos (2019–2020) as Renzo Volpi
 Madres. Amor y vida (2020) as Chema.

Episode
A flor de pell
Mirall trencat (2002) as Felip
Le dernier seigneur des Balkans (2005) as Dino Rispoli
Infidels (2009) as Marc Guasch 
 Hispania, la leyenda (2010) as Octavio
 Ángel o demonio (2011)
  (2013) as Carlos
 El don de Alba (2013) as Carlos Abrantes
 Isabel (2013) as Aben Hud
 Los misterios de Laura (2014) as Nicolás Madera. The mystery of the crime of the century. (Episode 7, Season 3.)
 La que se avecina (2014), as Jorge Crespo

Movies for TV

Another city (2003), by César Martínez Herrada
Viure sense by (2005), by Carlos Pérez Ferré
Projecte Cassandra (2005), by Xavier Manich

Theatre
Enigmatic Variations, directed by Christophe Lidón.
Ángel, directed by Jaume Pujol.
Macbeth, directed by Calixto Bieito. 
Por menjar-se ànima, directed by Carmen Portacelli.
The Cherry Orchard, directed by Lluís Pasqual. 
Cándido, directed by Carles Alfaro.
No teasing with love, directed by Dennise Rafter
Titanic. Pavana spectacles
Blood Wedding. Shakespeare Foundation of Valencia
Le Bourgeois gentilhomme. Teatre Micalet.
The Trojans, by Euripides. Adaptation by Alberto Conejero, directed by Carmen Portacelli

Awards and nominations
In the 2017 Feroz Awards, Fresneda was nominated as Best Leading Actor in a Series for The ministry of Time.

References

"'The Queen of the South' starts today on Antena 3". The free voice. Retrieved on 4 May 2020. 
"The comedy 'Gran Nord' will reach the beginning of l'any vinent on TV3". ara.cat (in Catalan). Retrieved on 4 May 2020. 
"Juan Fernández, Nacho Fresneda and María Cantuel join the cast of 'Víctor Ros ' ". mizonatv.com. Retrieved on 4 May 2020. 
"Nacho Fresneda, the 16th century soldier from 'The Ministry of Time ' ". The Newspaper. Retrieved on 4 May 2020. 
"Nacho Fresneda stars in a stellar performance in 'Ángel o demonio ' ". Telecinco. Retrieved on 4 May 2020. 
"Nacho Fresneda plays the film director interested in bringing Malena's work to the big screen in 'Familia' . " Telecinco. Retrieved on 4 May 2020. 
"Actors Nacho Fresneda and Ana Torrent participate in 'El don de Alba ' ". Telecinco. Retrieved on 4 May 2020. 
"Nacho Fresneda will be Jorge, the architect who designed" Mirador de Montepinar ", this Monday at LQSA". culturaenserie.com. Retrieved on 4 May 2020.

Spanish male television actors
Spanish male stage actors
People from Ciudad Real
Living people
21st-century Spanish male actors
Spanish male film actors
1971 births